The Quest is an American fantasy-based reality television series that streams on the network Disney+, that premiered on May 11, 2022. A reboot of the 2014 fantasy-based reality competition series of the same name, The Quest features a group of players brought to a castle in the fictional world of Everealm on a fantasy quest to save the realm from an evil force, and reveal the One True Hero among them who will defeat the evil. Compared to the 2014 version, this version has a similar type of narrative/reality game structure, but focuses more heavily on the scripted narrative, differing from the previous iteration. Unlike the 2014 series, in which the contestants were all adults, the players in this series are all teenagers.

Disney announced in January 2020 that a new version of The Quest would be produced for its Disney+ streaming service, with van Munster and Doganieri returning as executive producers. van Munster had pitched the revival to Disney after they had announced plans for the streaming service. On April 2, 2022, a trailer was released, announcing a May 11, 2022 premiere date.

Format
A group of teenagers participate in an immersive scripted adventure in a high fantasy setting, the kingdom of Everealm. The adventure is structured around various challenges tied to the fantasy storyline. While the ongoing storyline is scripted and the contestants are interacting with actors throughout the competition, the actual challenges are genuine, with competitive outcomes determined by the contestants' abilities and decisions. Unlike the 2014 series, the reboot is presented almost entirely in the mode of a traditional scripted drama, with minimal use of reality television devices such as confessionals or eliminations that would disrupt the immersion of the players in the adventure scenario.

Production
The Quest was produced by Court Five (producer of The Lord of the Rings trilogy), The New Media Collective (producer of The Amazing Race) and Scout Productions (producer of Queer Eye). It was filmed on location in Calistoga, California at Castello di Amorosa. Originally intended to film at Burg Kreuzenstein as with the 2014 series, the new series moved production to Castello di Amorosa in Napa Valley due to the COVID-19 pandemic. Production took place from January 2021 to March 2021.

Executive producers for the series are Jane Fleming and Mark Ordesky from Court Five; Bertram van Munster, Elise Doganieri and Mark Dziak from The New Media Collective; and Rob Eric, Michael Williams and David Collins from Scout Productions. Mike Foley is the showrunner.

Plot
The dark sorceress Tavora and her Dark Legion seek to conquer the magical world of Everealm. As he falls in battle, King Magnus of Sanctum entrusts the mythical Divine Crown with his footsoldier Mila to bring to his three children—Emmett, Adaline, and Cedric—heirs to the throne of Sanctum. Mila arrives in Oraa to deliver the Crown, where the heirs are in hiding under the protection of King Magnus's brother King Silas—along with Magnus's advisor, Dravus, a palace mage. At the same time, eight American teenagers are summoned to Oraa by the Fate Talmuh to restore the Divine Crown and redeem the bond between Everealm and the three Fates. Designated "Paladins," the eight teenagers must reclaim the Divine Crown's four Gems of Virtue. Through these and other challenges along the way, the Paladins demonstrate the virtues of a hero. For each challenge, and outstanding Paladin is awarded a talisman. The accumulation of talismans is used in determining the Paladins who may seek to claim the Divine Crown's fifth gem, the Kingstone, revealing themself as the "One True Hero" with the power to save Everealm.

Paladins
David (14, Waldorf, Maryland)
Serean (14, Tenino, Washington)
Holden (16, Northridge, California)
Myra (16, Queens, New York)
Shaan (13, San Ramon, California)
Ava (14, Northwood, New Hampshire)
Caden (16, Sugarland, Texas)
Toshani (14, Schenectady, New York)

Cast

 Emily Gateley as Mila, footsoldier of the Runeguard Army
 Braeden De La Garza as Prince Emmett, one of Sanctum's three heirs
 Racquel Jean-Louis as Princess Adaline, one of Sanctum's three heirs
 Elliott Ross as Prince Cederic, one of Sanctum's three heirs
 Kerwin Thompson as King Silas, King of Oraa
 Harry Aspinwall as Dravus, King Magnus' mage
 Mel Mehrabian as Sorceress Tavora
 Nandi Chapman as Talmuh, one of the three Fates.
 Sajel Oh as Solas, one of the three Fates.
 Louise Lagana as Karu, one of the three Fates.
 Keith G. Brown as King Magnus
 Frederic Winkler as General Kane, general of the Dark Legion
 Jarod Lindsey as Ramus, member of the Dark Legion
 Dane DiLiegro as the Dragior

Episodes

Game summary

Bold indicates a Paladin who was awarded a talisman for an outstanding performance in the challenge.

Talismans

 Talisman of Courage - Awarded to David
 Talisman of Speed - Awarded to Caden 
 Talisman of Strength - Awarded to David 
 Talisman of Initiative - Awarded to Shaan 
 Talisman of Wisdom - Awarded to Ava 
 Talisman of Resilience - Awarded to Serean 
 Talisman of Leadership - Awarded to Holden 
 Talisman of Knowledge - Awarded to Ava 
 Talisman of Ambition - Awarded to David 
 Talisman of Kindness - Awarded to Toshani and Myra 
 Talisman of Intelligence - Awarded to Serean
 Talisman of Friendship - Awarded to Holden 

Grouped based on the number of talismans accumulated, the Paladins selected a single member from each group to participate in the trial for the Kingstone. With the most talismans, David was the first Paladin selected. With 2 talismans apiece; Ava, Serean, and Holden were in the second group; from which Holden was selected. From the remaining Paladins, Toshani was chosen. In the trial, Holden was the first Paladin to complete the trial, and was the one to retrieve the Kingstone, proving himself the One True Hero.

Reception

Critical reception 
Several reviewers praised The Quest for its high production values for a reality TV show—with good effects and production design, dedicated performances by the actors, and ambitious scriptwriting—such that the show felt more like a regular scripted fantasy drama than a reality TV show. Reality TV blogger Andy Dehnart writes, "The show provides attention to details that few reality TV shows are even aware of, and there are plenty of scripted shows on broadcast and cable with weaker acting and writing." The actors were complimented on both their handling of the scripted material, as well as their apparent improvisational skills when dealing with the teenaged players. The enthusiastic, positive, and collaborative attitudes of the players was commended as a refreshing change of pace for a reality series, and wholesome for the intended young adult fiction audience. Denhart gave the series a "B" letter grade, Joel Keller for Decider gave The Quest a favorable "stream it" recommendation, and Tony Betti of Laughing Place gave it a score of 7 out of 10.

While praising the scripted fantasy aspect of the show, a number of reviewers expressed disappointment at the limited attention drawn to the players, with the little opportunity to distinguish them or explore their individual stories—which was attributed to the shift away from a reality TV presentation style. Regarding the omission of confessionals, Keller notes, "Without the benefit of side interviews, it’s hard to know exactly what these kids are thinking." Multiple reviewers remarked on being unable to name most of the players after watching the initial episodes. The reviewers posited that the quality of the scripted fantasy aspect of the show worked to the detriment of the players on the reality TV side of the show, with Denhart stating, "The Quest’s storytelling and production are so thoroughly immersive, it nearly entirely swallows the contestants, making them more like props than main characters."

From a scripted sci-fi/fantasy perspective, Nelson Acosta of Fiction Horizon called The Quest "a TV series that is trying to be two things at the same time," and deemed the series a failure on nearly every level from conception to execution—criticizing the believability of the players' behavior as "clearly directed," the acting as "pretty bad overall," and the story as "so incredibly generic that it is laughable." Acosta argued that having the entire season available to view all at once eliminates any suspense to a reality competition, and attributed the decision to an lack of faith on the part of Disney—an attempt to dispense with the series as quickly as possible. Acosta gave the series a score of 2 out of 10, calling it "potentially one of the worst shows of the year." Sharon at DisneyFanatic.com stated that "The Quest is filled with fantasy tropes. However, [...] the show comes across as charming in its predictability instead of being silly."

Accolades

References

External links

2020s American reality television series
Disney+ original programming
2022 American television series debuts
English-language television shows
American fantasy television series
Television shows filmed in California
Television series set in fictional countries
American television series revived after cancellation
Television series by Disney–ABC Domestic Television
Children's and Family Emmy Award winners